The official list of notable alumni and faculty of the University of West Florida.

The University of West Florida, also known as West Florida and UWF, is a mid-sized public university located in Pensacola, Florida, United States. The university enrolls approximately 12,000 students as of Fall 2009.

UWF is a member institution of the State University System of Florida. It is a doctoral/research university, specializing in engineering and the humanities. Its mascot is an Argonaut, and its logo is the chambered nautilus.

Notable alumni

Academics

Michael DeMaria - author
 P.S. Ruckman Jr. - nationally recognized pardon expert; editor, PardonPower blog

Artist
Ligel Lambert - interdisciplinary artist and educator

Athletics
{{columns-list|colwidth=20em|
Daniela Cruz - professional soccer player for the Costa Rica women's national football team
Mark Ettles - former MLB player for San Diego
Mickey Gorka (born 1972) - Israeli basketball player and coach
Roy Jones Jr. - world champion boxer
Moochie Norris - former NBA player
Jodi-Ann Robinson - UWF soccer player, represented Canada at the 2008 Beijing summer Olympics
Keith Savage - professional soccer player with the Portland Timbers of USL-1
Kevin Warrick - golfer, low amateur at 2002 U.S. Open
John Webb - former MLB player for Tampa Bay
Cole Filler - professional hockey player for Corpus Cristi Ice Rays, NAHL

Business
James Ellis - president and CEO of the Institute of Nuclear Power Operations at Lockheed Martin; former U.S. Navy admiral

Ann Vickers, CPA - Founder and CEO of Charles River CFO, prominent Boston financing & accounting outsourcing firm.

Entertainment and television

Military, space, and aviation

Politics

Science

Notable faculty
Judith A. Bense - former university president, professor and chair of the Department of Anthropology; archaeologist of the Southeastern United States

References

University of West Florida people